Chichester Castle stood in the city of the same name in West Sussex. Shortly after the Norman Conquest of England, Roger de Montgomery ordered the construction of a castle at Chichester. The castle at Chichester was one of 11 fortified sites to be established in Sussex before 1100. The Rape of Chichester, a subdivision of Sussex, was administered from the castle and was split off from the larger Rape of Arundel; a Rape was an administrative unit originating in the Saxon era and continued by the Normans. Situated in the north-east corner of Chichester, the castle was protected by the city walls. As it was an urban castle inserted into a pre-existing settlement, buildings were probably cleared to make way for the castle. Chichester Castle was of timber construction; although some timber castles were rebuilt in stone, there is no evidence that this was the case at Chichester.

Although the castle was originally built by the Earl of Shrewsbury, the Earls of Sussex owned it in the period 1154–1176, after which it passed into the possession of the Crown. Early in the 13th century, Chichester Castle was used as a court and jail. Chichester and Oxford Castle were two of the earliest urban castles to be used for this purpose, but gradually most urban castles were also used in this way. In 1216, the castle, along with many others in southern England, such as Reigate Castle in Surrey, was captured by the French. This was part of the First Barons' War against King John (reigned 1199–1216). The castle was recaptured by the English in the spring of 1217. In the same year, Henry III ordered the castle's destruction. Between 1222 and 1269, Richard, 1st Earl of Cornwall, gave the site to the order of Greyfriars for their use as the site of a friary. The remains of the motte are still visible in Priory Park, Chichester; the motte is protected as a Scheduled Monument.

See also
Noviomagus Reginorum – the Roman town of Chichester; the castle was situated in the northern part of the Roman military settlement

References
Notes

Bibliography

Further reading

Buildings and structures in Chichester
Tourist attractions in Chichester
Castles in West Sussex
Scheduled monuments in West Sussex